Silent Machine is the debut studio album by the Australian alternative metal band Twelve Foot Ninja. It was released through Volkanik Music on November 13, 2012.

Track listing

Personnel
 Kin Etik – lead vocals
 Steve "Stevic" MacKay – lead guitar
 Rohan Hayes – rhythm guitar, backing vocals
 Damon McKinnon – bass guitar
 Shane "Russ" Russell – drums

Additional musicians
 Ben Grayson – Hammond, clav, Rhodes, whurli, piano
 Nicholas Jeanney – guitar solo on track 6, additional production on track 6, dubstep synth on track 4
 Keith Draws – art direction, illustration
 John Calabro – graphic design, album layout
 Sam Luxford – graphic design, album layout

References

2012 debut albums
Twelve Foot Ninja albums